Kansas v. Hendricks, 521 U.S. 346 (1997), was a United States Supreme Court case in which the Court set forth procedures for the indefinite civil commitment of prisoners convicted of a sex offense whom the state deems dangerous due to a mental abnormality.

Background 
Under Kansas's Sexually Violent Predator Act (Act), any person who, due to "mental abnormality" or "personality disorder", is likely to engage in "predatory acts of sexual violence" can be indefinitely confined. Leroy Hendricks and Tim Quinn had extensive histories of sexually molesting children. When they were due to be released from prison, Kansas filed a petition under the Act in state court to involuntarily commit Hendricks and Quinn. Hendricks and Quinn challenged the constitutionality of the Act and requested a trial by jury which the court granted. Hendricks and Quinn testified during the trial that they agreed with the diagnosis by the state psychiatrist that Hendricks and Quinn suffer from pedophilia and admitted that they continued to experience uncontrollable sexual desires for children  when under extreme stress. The jury decided that they qualified as sexually violent predators. Since pedophilia is defined as a mental abnormality under the Act, the court ordered that Hendricks be civilly committed.

Hendricks appealed the validity of his commitment as well as claiming that the state was unconstitutionally using ex post facto and double jeopardy law, to the State Supreme Court. The court ruled that the Act was invalid on the grounds that the condition of "mental abnormality" did not satisfy the "substantive" due process requirement that involuntary civil commitment must be based on the finding of the presence of a "mental illness". It did not address the claims of ex post-facto and double jeopardy.

The Supreme Court granted Kansas' certiorari.

Decision
The Supreme Court ruled against Hendricks in a 5–4 decision. It agreed with the Act's procedures and the definition of a  "mental abnormality" as a "congenital or acquired condition affecting the emotional or volitional capacity which predisposes the person to commit sexually violent offenses to the degree that such person is a menace to the health and safety of others." It agreed with Kansas that the Act limits persons eligible for confinement to persons who are not able to control their dangerousness.

Further, the court decided the Act does not violate the Constitution's double jeopardy prohibition nor the ban on ex post facto law because the Act does not establish criminal proceedings and therefore involuntary confinement under it is not punishment. Because the Act is civil, Hendricks' confinement under the Act is not a second prosecution nor is it double jeopardy. And finally, the court said the Act is not considered punitive if it fails to offer treatment for an untreatable condition.

Significance
The court's finding that preventive long-term confinement of  mentally disordered persons has previously been justified on the grounds that some people's behavior cannot be prevented, and it does not violate their rights to confine them to deter antisocial behavior. However, it has also been argued that upholding the Act expands involuntary civil commitment to people with personality disorders, possibly allowing for the commitment of large numbers of criminals if the proof of the likelihood of re-offending required is sufficiently inclusive, which could happen if the requirement of  dangerousness is not limited to those with a mental illness, and that if mental abnormality (rather than mental illness) can be the basis for sex offender commitment, there is a danger that it  may expand the basis for traditional civil commitment to personality disorders as well.

In the subsequent Kansas v. Crane (2002), this decision was upheld for an individual that suffered from exhibitionism and antisocial personality disorder.

See also
 List of United States Supreme Court cases, volume 521
 List of United States Supreme Court cases
 Lists of United States Supreme Court cases by volume
 Smith v. Doe (2003)
 United States v. Comstock (2010)

Footnotes

External links
 
Kansas v. Crane, Michael
Kansas v. Hendricks
United States of America v. Jason M. Weed, appeal decision

Mental health law in the United States
Civil commitment of sex offenders
United States Constitution Article One case law
United States ex post facto case law
United States Supreme Court cases
United States Supreme Court cases of the Rehnquist Court
1997 in United States case law
Legal history of Kansas